4832 Palinurus  is a Jupiter trojan from the Trojan camp, approximately  in diameter. It was discovered on 12 October 1988, by American astronomer Carolyn Shoemaker at the Palomar Observatory in California. The dark D-type asteroid belongs to the 90 largest Jupiter trojans and has a short rotation period of 5.3 hours. It was named after Aeneas' navigator, Palinurus, from Greek mythology.

Orbit and classification 

Palinurus is a Jovian asteroid in the so-called Trojan camp, located in the  Lagrangian point, 60° behind Jupiter, orbiting in a 1:1 resonance with the Gas Giant . It is also a non-family asteroid of the Jovian background population.

It orbits the Sun at a distance of 4.5–6.0 AU once every 12 years and 1 month (4,416 days; semi-major axis of 5.27 AU). Its orbit has an eccentricity of 0.14 and an inclination of 19° with respect to the ecliptic. The body's observation arc begins at Palomar in September 1988, one month prior to its official discovery observation.

Physical characteristics 

In the SDSS-based taxonomy, Palinurus is a dark D-type asteroid. Pan-STARRS' survey has also characterized it as a D-type, which is the most common spectral type among the larger Jupiter trojans. It has a high V–I color index of 1.00.

Rotation period 

In July 2010, a rotational lightcurve of Palinurus was obtained during eight consecutive nights by Italian astronomer Stefano Mottola at the Calar Alto Observatory in Spain. Lightcurve analysis gave a rotation period of  hours with a brightness variation of 0.09 magnitude.

In January 2015, photometric observations by Robert Stephens at the Center for Solar System Studies in Landers, California, determined a period of  hours with an amplitude of 0.16 magnitude based on a fragmentary lightcurve.

Diameter and albedo 

According to the survey carried out by the NEOWISE mission of NASA's Wide-field Infrared Survey Explorer, Palinurus measures 52.06 kilometers in diameter and its surface has an albedo of 0.071,
while the Collaborative Asteroid Lightcurve Link assumes a standard albedo for a C-type asteroid of 0.057 and calculates a similar diameter of 53.16 kilometers based on an absolute magnitude of 10.1.

Naming 

This minor planet was named by the discoverer from Greek mythology after Palinurus, the great helmsman of Aeneas's ship. After the fall of Troy in the Trojan War, he led the rest of the Trojan fleet to Carthage, Sicily, and finally to Italy. The official naming citation was published by the Minor Planet Center on 25 August 1991.

Notes

References

External links 
 Asteroid Lightcurve Database (LCDB), query form (info )
 Dictionary of Minor Planet Names, Google books
 Discovery Circumstances: Numbered Minor Planets (1)-(5000) – Minor Planet Center
 Asteroid 4832 Palinurus at the Small Bodies Data Ferret
 
 

004832
Discoveries by Carolyn S. Shoemaker
Named minor planets
19881012